This is a list of lists of association football clubs from all over the world. Each of the articles linked from here lists clubs playing at the highest level in each country; for clubs playing at lower divisions, see separate linked articles.

Africa (CAF)

Asia (AFC)

Europe (UEFA)

North, Central America and the Caribbean (CONCACAF)

Oceania (OFC)

South America (CONMEBOL)

See also
Association football club names
List of association football competitions
List of men's national association football teams

External links
RSSSF - current domestic results

Clubs